ARA Almirante Domecq Garcia (D23) was a  which served with the Argentine Navy from 1971 to 1983.

She was commissioned on 11 May 1943, in Bath, Maine, sponsored by Mrs Daniel L. Braine, wife of the grandson of Rear Admiral Braine (1829-1898), a veteran of the Mexican War and the Civil War. While in service with the US Navy, the destroyer USS Braine participated in many famous campaigns in the Pacific during World War II, and also had a distinguished role during the Cold War.

The Argentine Navy took possession of Braine on 17 August 1971, and renamed her Almirante Domecq Garcia, after Admiral Manuel Domecq Garcia (1859-1951), one of the founders of the modern Argentine Navy. The ship was commissioned at Treasure island, San Francisco, in a ceremony attended by Admiral Garcia's daughter, Mrs. Eugenia Domecq Garcia de Forn. Commander Mario Eduardo Olmas assumed command and raised the flag of the Republic of Argentina. The USS Cowell (DD-547), also a Fletcher-class destroyer, was also acquired by Argentina in 1971 and renamed ARA Almirante Storni (D-24). Argentina had already acquired three destroyers of the Fletcher class in 1962: Stembel (D-644), Dortch (D-670) and Heermann (D-532).

After minor repairs, ARA Almirante Domecq Garcia (D-23) left California in October 1971, reaching El Callao in November. She arrived at the Naval Base of Puerto Belgrano and joined the sea fleet on 21 November 1971.

In 1975, while in service with the Argentine Navy, the British ship Shackleton was observed doing oceanographic investigations on the Argentine platform. ARA Almirante Domecq Garcia (D-23) participated in the international exercises UNITAS XVII in 1976, and UNITAS XXI in 1980, and with the Uruguayan Navy in the exercises CORMORAN IV and VI, in 1977 and 1978 respectively. In 1976, the destroyer operated in joint exercises with the Brazilian ships Pernambuco and Maranhao. In the Falklands War, 1982, the ship acted as early anti-air alarm, near Bahia Blanca; also fulfilled functions on the control of maritime transit, looking for illegal fishing ships.

On 30 November 1982 the ship's flag was lowered. She had sailed  under the flag of the Republic of Argentina. She was sunk as a target on October 1983, off Mar del Plata by the combined action of an Exocet MM-38  missile launched by the corvette  and a torpedo fired from the submarine . However, in the book of the ARA Gurruchaga, 16 November 1986, says that it towed the destroyer Almirante Domerq Garcia (D-23) to the position 39° 57' S, 57° 56' W, and that at 5.30 pm engines were stopped, being ARA Gurruchaga at 1 N.M. of the ship. At 7.04 pm contact was lost. Her final resting place is 39° 57' S, 57° 57' W.

See also
 List of ships of the Argentine Navy

Notes

External links
USS Braine archived website
https://gacetamarinera.com.ar/especiales/el-legado-del-almirante-manuel-domecq-garcia/
https://www.histarmar.com.ar/Armada%20Argentina/Buques1900a1970/DDAlmDGarcia-1971.htm

Cold War destroyers of Argentina
1943 ships
Ships sunk as targets
Maritime incidents in 1983
Shipwrecks of the Argentine coast
Brown-class destroyers